Steve Englehart  (born April 11, 1977) is an American football coach and former player. He is the head football coach at Presbyterian College in Clinton, South Carolina, a position he has held since 2022. He was previously the first and only head coach at the Florida Institute of Technology, serving from program's inception in 2013 to its dissolution in 2019. Englehart was also the head football coach at Rose–Hulman Institute of Technology from 2006 to 2009 and an assistant coach at Indiana State University from 2010 to 2012.

Personal life
Englehart was born in Terre Haute, Indiana, to Steve Englehart and his wife, Debbie. Steve graduated from Terre Haute North High School and later married Carrie May on May 13, 2000. They have three children together, two sons, Caden and Ty, and a daughter, Lila.

Englehart graduated from Indiana State University in Terre Haute, where he played quarterback for the football team under head coaches Dennis Raetz and Tim McGuire.

Head coaching record

References

External links
 Florida Tech profile
 Indiana State profile

1977 births
Living people
American football quarterbacks
Florida Tech Panthers football coaches
Indiana State Sycamores football coaches
Indiana State Sycamores football players
Northeastern State RiverHawks football coaches
Rose–Hulman Fightin' Engineers football coaches
Presbyterian Blue Hose football coaches
Sportspeople from Terre Haute, Indiana